JS Sendai (DE-232) is the fourth ship of the s. She was commissioned on 26 January 1990.

Construction and career
Sendai was laid down at Sumitomo Heavy Industries Tokyo Shipyard on 14 April 1989 and launched on 19 December 1989. She was commissioned on 15 March 1991 and deployed to Sasebo.

On June 20, 1991, the 39th Escort Corps was newly formed under the Sasebo District Force and was incorporated with JS Ōyodo.

On March 24, 1997, the 39th escort corps was renamed to the 26th escort corps due to the revision of the corps number.

March 25–26, 2008 Hostship with the Thai Navy Naresuan-class frigate HTMS Naresuan and Chao Phraya-class frigate HTMS Saiburi who called at Sasebo.

At noon on February 16, 2018, her along with P-3C belonging to the 1st Air Group, a North Korean-registered tanker Yu Jong No. 2 was released as Ningde Oil 078 in the open sea of the East China Sea (about 250 km east of Shanghai). Its prohibited by the UN Security Council resolution. It was confirmed that she was doing the work that seems to be Setori. This was the first time for the Self-Defense Forces to be recognized by ships against North Korea.

At noon on June 29, 2018, a North Korean-registered tanker AN SAN 1 came into contact with a ship of unknown ship registration in the high seas of the East China Sea (about 350 km off the south-southeast of Shanghai). She confirmed that she was performing what appears to be a ship-to-ship banned by a UN Security Council resolution. AN SAN No. 1 was designated by the United Nations Security Council North Korea Sanctions Committee as a target of asset freezing and port entry prohibition in March 2018, but the ship name was HOPE SEA to avoid sanctions. It was also confirmed that it was disguised as "No.".

From August 23 to August 27, 2019, she hosted the Canadian Navy Halifax-class frigate HMCS Ottawa, who called at Maizuru for goodwill visit. Before dawn on November 13, 2019, a North Korean-registered tanker MU BONG 1 came into contact with a ship of unknown ship registration in the high seas of the East China Sea (about 280 km east of Shanghai). She confirmed that she was performing what appears to be a ship-to-ship banned by a UN Security Council resolution. It was also confirmed that the ship whose nationality was unknown covered the ship name with something to avoid sanctions.

Gallery

Citations

External links

1990 ships
Abukuma-class destroyer escorts
Ships built by Sumitomo Heavy Industries